Tubed, Latehar  is a village in Latehar district of Jharkhand state of India.

References

Villages in Latehar district